Albert Andrew James Larmour (born 27 May 1951) is a former Northern Irish professional footballer.

Early life
He was born in Donegall Road area of Belfast. Before becoming a professional footballer, Larmour worked as a welder in an aircraft factory in Belfast.

Playing career
Starting his career at Linfield, he joined Cardiff City in June 1972 for £14,000, the second highest transfer fee in Ireland at the time, after manager Jimmy Scoular spotted him during a trip to watch goalkeeper Bill Irwin. A year later, the 1974–75 season, he began to make an impact on the first team, scoring his first goal for the club during a 5–2 loss to Wrexham in the second leg of the Welsh Cup final. He helped Cardiff City to promotion the following year with a very consistent run before losing his place in the 1978–79 season when Cardiff paid £65,000 to bring Hull City defender Dave Roberts to the club. He joined Torquay United instead, being handed captaincy on his arrival and spending two years at the club before retiring after a car accident and became a very popular head of the successful academy.

References

1951 births
Living people
Association footballers from Belfast
Association footballers from Northern Ireland
Linfield F.C. players
Cardiff City F.C. players
Torquay United F.C. players
English Football League players
Association football defenders